Adolphe Napoléon Didron (1806–1867) was a French art historian and archaeologist.

Biography
Adolphe Napoléon Didron was born in Hautvillers on 13 March 1806. He began his education as a student of law. He then completed his early studies at the preparatory seminaries of Meaux and Reims.

He became a professor of history in Paris in 1826, and devoted his leisure hours to following courses of law, medicine, etc. In 1830, he began, on the advice of Victor Hugo, a study of the Christian archaeology of the Middle Ages. After visiting and examining the principal churches, first of Normandy, then of central and southern France, he was on his return in 1835 appointed by Guizot secretary to the Historical Committee of Arts and Monuments; and in the following years he delivered several courses of lectures on Christian iconography at the Bibliothèque Royale.

In 1839, he visited Greece for the purpose of examining the art of the Eastern Church, both in its buildings and its manuscripts. In 1844, he originated the Annales archéologiques, a periodical devoted to his favorite subject, which he edited until his death. In 1845 he established at Paris a special archaeological press, and at the same time a stained glass factory. In the same year he was admitted to the Légion d'honneur.

His most important work is the Iconographie chrétienne, of which, however, the first portion only, Histoire de Dieu, was published, in 1843. It was translated into English by E. J. Millington. Among his other works may be mentioned the introduction and comments to Manuel d'iconographie chrétienne grecque et latine (by Dionysios of Fourna, translated by Paul Durand), published in 1845, the Iconographie des chapiteaux du palais ducal de Venise of 1857, and the Manuel des objets de bronze et d'orfèvrerie, published in 1859.

He died on 13 November 1867.

Notes

References 
Catherine Brisac & Jean-Michel Leniaud, Adolphe-Napoléon Didron ou les media au service de l'art chrétien, in Revue de l'Art, 77, 1987, pp. 33–42.

1806 births
1867 deaths
People from Marne (department)
French art historians
French archaeologists
Chevaliers of the Légion d'honneur